"Évidemment" is a 1987 pop song recorded by French singer France Gall. It was the third single from her album Babacar and was released on 7 March 1988. In France, the song achieved success, becoming Gall's third top ten hit.

Background
Written by Gall's husband Michel Berger, the song is a tribute to Daniel Balavoine who was a close friend of the couple and who died about two years earlier. The B-side of the vinyl, "La Chanson d'Azima", became the fifth and last single from the album and was released in April 1989. "Évidemment" was included on the singer's albums Live, le tour de France (live released in 1988), Les Années Musique (best of, 1990), Live à Bercy (live, 1993) France in a 4:30 acoustic version (1996), Concert Privé M6 (live, 1997) and Évidemment (double best of, 2004). In a 2004 interview Gall said: ""Évidemment" is my saddest song, my song of absence. (...) 'Évidemment / on rit encore / mais pas comme avant' (...) [which can mean] 'I'm here (...) but it's not like before'. It's true."

Chart performance
"Évidemment" was a successful single in France: it started at number 19 on the chart edition of 2 April 1988, then climbed almost every week and eventually peaked at number six in its tenth week; it totalled 16 weeks in the top 50, seven of them in the top ten. It became the second most successful single from the album in terms of chart positions and the third one in terms of sales. On the European Hot 100 Singles, it started at number 55 on 16 April 1988, reached a peak of number 24 nine weeks later, and fell off the chart after 15 weeks of presence. It also charted for six weeks on the European Airplay Top 50, with a peak at number 23 in its third week.

Cover versions
The song was covered by many artists, including Maurane, Lara Fabian, Patrick Fiori and Pascal Obispo on the 2001 album L'Odyssée des Enfoirés, Emma Daumas, Houcine, Aurélie Konaté, Nolwenn Leroy and Anne-Laure Sibon (five contestants of the French Star Academy 2) on the 2002 album Star Academy chante Michel Berger, and Mimmy Mathy and Jean-Baptiste Maunier on the 2005 album Le Train des Enfoirés. The song was also covered by Julie Pietri on her 2007 album Autour de minuit.

Track listings
 7" single
 "Évidemment" – 3:26
 "La Chanson d'Azima" – 2:45

 CD maxi
 "Évidemment"
 "Ella, elle l'a"
 "La Chanson d'Azima"

Credits
 Music: Michel Berger
 Lyrics: Michel Berger
 Vocals: France Gall
 Recorded by Jean-Pierre Janiaud
 Assisted by Olivier do Espirito Santo
 Recorded at Studios Gang, in Paris.

Charts

Kate Ryan version

Some weeks before the release of French Connection, Kate Ryan's greatest hits album, it was announced that the next single to "Babacar" would be her cover version of the song. It was released on 9 October 2009. It has two versions: the main version, produced by Yves Gaillard, is a pop ballad with piano and voice, and the 2N Remix, produced by Niclas Kings and Niklas Bergwall (2N), is dance version.

Track listings
 CD single
 "Évidemment" — 3.10
 "Évidemment" (2N remix) — 3.18

Charts

References

1987 songs
1988 singles
2009 singles
France Gall songs
Kate Ryan songs
Pop ballads
Songs written by Michel Berger
Song recordings produced by Michel Berger